Lupinus truncatus is a species of lupine known by the common name collared annual lupine.

It is native to the coastal mountain ranges and canyons of Baja California and California as far north as the San Francisco Bay Area. It grows in slope habitat such as chaparral and woodland, including areas that have recently burned.

Description
Each palmate leaf is made up of 5 to 8 narrow linear leaflets measuring 2 to 4 centimeters in length and just a few millimeters wide. The leaflets usually have truncate tips, or tips that appear sharply cut off and squared, the characteristic that gives the plant its species name.

The inflorescence is a raceme of widely spaced flowers each roughly a centimeter long. The flower is magenta or reddish purple in color with a yellowish or magenta patch on its banner.

The fruit is a hairy legume pod about 3 centimeters long and half a centimeter wide.

See also
California chaparral and woodlands

External links
Jepson Manual Treatment: Lupinus truncatus
Lupinus truncatus — U.C. Photo gallery

truncatus
Flora of California
Flora of Baja California
Natural history of the California chaparral and woodlands
Natural history of the California Coast Ranges
Natural history of the Peninsular Ranges
Natural history of the Santa Monica Mountains
Natural history of the Transverse Ranges
Flora without expected TNC conservation status